The Boeing Company's Spatial Query Server is a commercially available product which enables a Sybase database to contain spatial features.

Geometric types
Circle
Ellipse
Point - a point in 2D space.  (x,y) plane.
Voxel - a point in 3D space.  (x,y,z) volume.
Polygon
Polygon(n)
Polygon set
Gpolygon
Gpolygon(n)
Gpolygon_set
Line
Line(n)
Line_set
Rectangle
Rectangle_set
Llbox
Llbox_set

See also
Sybase Spatial Implementation

External links
Boeing SQS
Release Notes for Version 3.6
Product Brochure
Teradata Magazine Spatial Query Server (SQS) Article
Open Geospatial Consortium: Simple Feature Access - Part 1: Common Architecture 

Proprietary database management systems